Robert Boris (October 12, 1945) is an American screenwriter, film producer and director.

Boris was nicknamed Double B by film producer Elliott Kastner.

Awards
Boris won the WGA Award for Original/Adapted Multi-Part Long Form Series for Blood Feud in 1984.

Filmography
Birds of Prey (with Rupert Hitzig) (1973) (TV)
Electra Glide in Blue (with Rupert Hitzig) (1973)
Some Kind of Hero (with James Kirkwood Jr.) (1982)
Deadly Encounter (with David J. Kinghorn) (1982) (TV)
Blood Feud (1983) (TV)
Doctor Detroit (with Carl Gottlieb and Bruce Jay Friedman) (1983)
Oxford Blues (1984) (also Director)
Izzy and Moe (with Steven Patrick Bell, Jim Cash & Jack Epps Jr.) (1985) (TV)
Steele Justice (1987) (also Director)
Buy & Cell (1988) (Director Only)
Marilyn and Me (1991) (TV)
Extreme Justice (with Frank Sacks) (1993)
Frank and Jesse (1994) (Director Only)
Diplomatic Siege (with Mark Amin, Sam Bernard and Kevin Bernhardt) (1999)
Backyard Dogs (2000) (also Director)
Deep Freeze (with Dennis A. Pratt and Matthew Jason Walsh) (2002)
Little Hercules in 3-D (2009)

References

External links

1945 births
American television writers
Film producers from New York (state)
American male screenwriters
Living people
Writers from New York City
American male television writers
Film directors from New York City
Screenwriters from New York (state)